Pak Tin Estate is a public housing estate in Shek Kip Mei, Sham Shui Po, Kowloon, Hong Kong, located between Shek Kip Mei Estate and Chak On Estate.

Background
Before redevelopment, Pak Tin Estate consisted of 17 residential blocks in total, which were built between 1969 and 1979. Block 1 to 3 and Block 7 to 17 were assigned to Upper Pak Tin Estate, while Block 4 to 6 were assigned to Lower Pak Tin Estate. In 1984, two estates were merged to form Pak Tin Estate. In 1985, the Hong Kong Housing Authority announced that the strength of the concrete of Block 14 to 16 had structural problems and they were firstly demolished in 1989. Block 4 to 8 and Block 17 were then demolished in the 1990s. Except Block 1 to 3 and Block 9 to 13, the demolished blocks are now replaced by new-typed buildings.

Houses

Pak Tin Commercial Complex

Pak Tin Commercial Complex is located in Pak Tin Estate, Sham Shui Po. It was built right at the time, when the 17 residential blocks of Pak Tin Estate were built. It is a 3-storey building and this property is managed by Synergis Management Services Limited. 

The complex comprises 14 shops, four cooked food stalls and 69 market stalls with a total lettable area of around 2 000 square metres. In addition, there are 32 shops and 12 shop stalls on the ground level of the domestic blocks in Pak Tin Estate. 

Pak Tin Commercial Complex is easily accessible. There is a car park inside the complex with 335 parking spaces and three other car parks at Pak Tin Estate which consist of 354 parking spaces. It is well served by public transport including many bus routes. The MTR Shek Kip Mei station is nearby and a bus terminal is located in Pak Tin Estate.

See also
 Public housing estates in Shek Kip Mei
 Shek Kip Mei Park

References

Shek Kip Mei
Public housing estates in Hong Kong